The Titford Canal is a narrow (7 foot) canal, a short branch of the Birmingham Canal Navigations (BCN) in Oldbury, West Midlands, England.

Authorised under the Birmingham Canal Act 1768 which created the original Birmingham Canal, it was constructed in 1836-7 and opened on 4 November 1837. It now runs from Titford Pool, a reservoir made in 1773-4 which now lies under, and to both sides of, an elevated section of the M5 motorway near the motorway's junction 2, to join the BCN Old Main Line at Oldbury Junction, also under the M5.

Beyond Titford Pool was a continuation, abandoned in 1954, as the Portway Branch, which served coal mines in the Titford Valley. Also from Titford Pool was the Causeway Green Branch; opened in 1858 and abandoned, in parts, in 1954 and September 1960.

Titford Pool
At a height above sea level of 511 ft Titford Pool was one of the original water sources for the James Brindley 491 foot Smethwick Summit Level of his Birmingham Canal (later called the Old Main Line). Titford Pool is also the highest navigable canal in the Midlands, with only Rochdale Canal beating it at 600 feet above sea level.

This feeder was not made navigable until 1837, with the addition of six locks, nicknamed The Crow, which were adjacent to chemical works owned by Jim Crow. These locks, as is usual on the BCN, have single lower gates to reduce leakage. The Titford Locks (also known as Oldbury Locks) became derelict and were restored in 1973-4.

The canal
Between Titford Pool and the locks is the Grade II listed Langley Maltings (previously used for the malting stage of beer-making).  Sadly the Maltings have been badly damaged by fire.

At the top lock stands the grade II listed Titford Engine House; built to pump water back up the six locks from the Wolverhampton Level, but later more often used to supply the feeder. It is now the headquarters of the Birmingham Canal Navigations Society.

Also at the top lock is the junction with the Tat Bank Branch (or Spon Lane Branch), no longer navigable, which was the original feeder to the Smethwick Summit, and is now a feeder (made by Thomas Telford, 1830) to Edgbaston Reservoir (Rotton Park Reservoir) which itself feeds the Birmingham and Wolverhampton Levels of the BCN. It was later made navigable for a part of its length to the Stourbridge Railway at Rood End and the British Industrial Plastics chemical factory was built upon it. It is now impassable and without towpath access.

Titford Pool, Tat Bank Branch and the top pound of the Titford Canal are the highest point of the BCN. They are accessible from Engine Street. The Inland Waterways Association National Festival was held at Titford in 1978 and 1982.

Features

See also

Canals of the United Kingdom
History of the British canal system

References

External links
BCNS Titford Pumphouse and Canal
BCNS Restoration, incl Titford Pumphouse
BCNS Gallery No. 5 Smethwick

Birmingham Canal Navigations
Canals in the West Midlands (county)
Canals opened in 1837